Fontana is a surname. Notable people with the surname include:

In arts and entertainment

Architecture
Carlo Fontana (1634 or 1638–1714), an Italian architect
Domenico Fontana (1543–1607), an Italian architect
Giovanni Fontana (architect) (1540–1614), an Italian architect
Jakub Fontana (1710-1773) Polish architect
Luigi Fontana (1827–1908), an Italian sculptor, painter and architect

Music
Bill Fontana (b. 1947), an American composer, author of sound sculptures
Carl Fontana (1928–2003), an American jazz trombonist
D.J. Fontana (1931–2018), an American drummer
Giovanni Battista Fontana (composer) (c. 1571–1630), an Italian composer and a violinist
Jimmy Fontana (1934–2013), an Italian composer and singer-songwriter
Julian Fontana (1810–1869), a Polish pianist and composer
Melanie Fontana (b. 1986), an American pop singer
Wayne Fontana (1945–2020), an English pop singer

Visual arts
Annibale Fontana (1540–1587), an Italian sculptor and crystal-worker
Franco Fontana (born 1933), an Italian photographer
Giovanni Battista Fontana (painter) (1524–1587), an Italian painter and engraver
Lavinia Fontana (1552–1614), an Italian painter
Lucio Fontana (1899–1968), an Argentine modern artist
Luigi Fontana (1827–1908), an Italian sculptor, painter and architect

Writing
D.C. Fontana (1939–2019), an American science fiction writer
Giovanni Fontana (poet) (born 1946), an Italian poet and publisher
Tom Fontana (born 1951), an American television writer/producer

Other arts
Federica Fontana (born 1977), a model
Isabeli Fontana (born 1983), a Brazilian model
Santino Fontana, (born 1982), an American actor
Tom Fontana (born 1951), an American television writer/producer

In science and academia
Alessandro Fontana (1936–2013), Italian academic and politician
David Fontana (1934–2010), British academic, psychologist and author
Francesco Fontana (1580–1656), an Italian astronomer
Felice Fontana (1730–1805), an Italian scientist
Giovanni Fontana (engineer) (ca. 1395 – ca. 1455), Italian physician and engineer
Gregorio Fontana (1735–1803), an Italian mathematician
Niccolò Fontana Tartaglia (1499–1557), an Italian mathematician

In sport
Alberto Fontana (born 1967), an Italian footballer
Alberto Maria Fontana (born 1974), an Italian footballer
Arianna Fontana (born 1990), an Italian short track speed skater
José de Anchieta Fontana (1940–1980), a Brazilian soccer player/footballer
 Lorenzo Fontana (born 1996), Italian rower
Luciano Fontana (born 1965), Italian ski mountaineer and cross-country skier
Norberto Fontana (born 1975), an Argentine racing driver

In other fields
Ilaria Fontana (born 1984), Italian politician
Lorenzo Fontana (born 1980), Italian politician
Paul J. Fontana (1911–1997), American Marine general, flying ace and Navy Cross recipient
Richard Fontana (birth date unknown), an open source lawyer

Italian-language surnames
Italian toponymic surnames